The Trofeo Ricardo Delgado Aray (also known as the Manta Open) is a professional tennis tournament played on outdoor hard courts. It is currently part of the ATP Challenger Tour. It is held annually at the Umiña Tenis Club in Manta, Ecuador, since 2004.

Past finals

Singles

Doubles

External links
Official website
ITF Search

 
ATP Challenger Tour
Hard court tennis tournaments
Tennis tournaments in Ecuador